Ben Dolnick (born 1982) is an American fiction writer and author of the novels Zoology (2007), You Know Who You Are (2011), and At the Bottom of Everything: A Novel (2013).

Life
Ben Dolnick was born and raised in Chevy Chase, Maryland.  He is the son of Lynn Iphigene (née Golden) and Edward Dolnick; and a nephew of Arthur Golden, author of Memoirs of a Geisha. Through his mother's side he is a member of the Ochs-Sulzberger family, publishers of The New York Times. He attended Georgetown Day School and went on to receive his undergraduate degree from Columbia University, and has worked as a "zookeeper" at the Central Park Zoo. He currently lives in Brooklyn, New York.

The New York Times has been criticized for printing an article by Dolnick, promoting his novels, without taking into account the conflict of interest resulting from his mother being on the paper's board of directors.

Works

The Ghost Notebooks, 2018

References 

1982 births
Living people
21st-century American novelists
American male novelists
Columbia College (New York) alumni
Sulzberger family
21st-century American male writers
Writers from Brooklyn
Georgetown Day School alumni